IPTraf  is a software - based console that provides network statistics. It works by collecting information from TCP connections, such as statistics and activity interfaces and drops TCP and UDP traffic. It is available in Linux operating systems.

Features 

In addition to a menu of options to full screen, IPTraf has the following characteristics:

 IP traffic monitor displays information about network traffic.
 General statistics Interfaces.
 LAN statistics module that discovers s host displays data about their activity.
 Monitor TCP, UDP account showing the network packets for port connections of applications.
 Use the "raw socket interface" that takes kernel allowing it to be used by a wide range of "network cards".

Recognized protocols 

IPTtraf supports multiple protocols:

 IP
 TCP
 UDP
 ICMP
 IGP
 IGMP
 IGRP
 OSPF
 ARP
 RARP

Supported interfaces 

IPTraf supports a wide range of network interfaces:

 Local loopback
 All Ethernet interfaces supported by Linux.
 All FDDI interfaces supported by Linux.
 SLIP
 Asynchronous PPP
 Synchronous PPP over ISDN
 ISDN with encapsulation Raw IP
 ISDN with encapsulation Cisco HDLC
 Parallel Line IP.

Data structures 

The main data structures using the various facilities of the program are in doubly linked list, which facilitates their movement. The maximum number of entries is limited only by available memory. Search operations in most of the facilities are carried out linearly, a fact that causes a mild but almost imperceptible impact. Because of the speed with which tends to increase the traffic monitor IPs, it use a hash table to perform searches more efficiently. (Search operations are carried out whenever the program needs to check if it is already listed the Ethernet or IP address or protocol or network port.

In addition, also it has a folding mechanism links merely contains notes on old entries that are available for reuse. Every time a connection is restarted or completely closed, the ticket information is not released, but added an entry to the closed-list.  By detecting a new connection, the list is checked and if it is not empty, the first entry in use that is available will be reused, then, clear the list-closed

References

External links 
 IPTraf web site
 IPTraf-ng, current fork of IPtraf

Free software
Linux software